Warm Wave is an album by Latin jazz vibraphonist Cal Tjader fronting an orchestra arranged and conducted by Claus Ogerman recorded in 1964 and released on the Verve label.

Reception

The Allmusic review by Stephen Cook stated, "If an album ever betrayed Cal Tjader's affinity for former boss George Shearing's ultra-smooth cocktail style, then Warm Wave would be it ... this is less standard Latin lounge Tjader and more an analog to Jackie Gleason's polished easy-listening sound. Tjader's solos are so smooth, in fact, that they practically disappear into Claus Ogerman's opaque arrangements. If you are in the business of collecting classic lounge records, this rates as a good one".

Track listing
 "Where Or When" (Richard Rodgers, Lorenz Hart) – 2:47
 "Violets for Your Furs" (Matt Dennis, Tom Adair) – 3:02
 "People" (Jule Styne, Bob Merrill) – 2:31
 "Poor Butterfly" (Raymond Hubbell, John Golden) – 2:13
 "This Time the Dream's on Me" (Harold Arlen, Johnny Mercer) – 1:57
 "Ev'ry Time We Say Goodbye" (Cole Porter) – 2:44
 "I'm Old Fashioned" (Jerome Kern, Mercer) – 2:28
 "The Way You Look Tonight" (Kern, Dorothy Fields) – 3:05
 "Just Friends" (John Klenner, Sam M. Lewis) – 2:18
 "Sunset Blvd." (Claus Ogerman) – 2:35
 "Passé" (Joseph Meyer, Carl Sigman, Eddie DeLange) – 2:40

Personnel
Cal Tjader – vibraphone
Claus Ogerman – arranger, conductor
Seldon Powell, Jerome Richardson – tenor saxophone
Patti Bown, Hank Jones, Bernie Leighton – piano
Kenny Burrell, Jimmy Raney – guitar
George Duvivier – bass
Ed Shaughnessy – drums 
Willie Rodriguez – percussion
Les Double Six – vocals (tracks 3, 4 & 7–11)
Unidentified string section (tracks 1–3, 5, 6, 8, 9 & 11)

References

Verve Records albums
Cal Tjader albums
1964 albums
Albums produced by Creed Taylor
Albums arranged by Claus Ogerman
Albums conducted by Claus Ogerman
Albums recorded at Van Gelder Studio